Ciocârlia is a commune in Constanța County, Northern Dobruja, Romania. The commune includes two villages:

 Ciocârlia (historical names: Ciocârlia  de Jos until 1968, Biulbiul-Mic)
 Ciocârlia de Sus (historical names: Biulbiul-Mare)

Demographics
At the 2011 census, Ciocârlia had 2,795 Romanians (87.73%), 91 Turks (2.86%), 292 Tatars (9.17%), 8 others (0.25%).

Natives
Yusuf Isa Halim

References

Communes in Constanța County
Localities in Northern Dobruja